The following is a list of people executed by the United States federal government.

Post-Gregg executions 
Sixteen executions (none of them military) have occurred in the modern post-Gregg era. Since 1963, sixteen people have been executed under federal jurisdiction by the United States federal government. All were executed by lethal injection at USP Terre Haute.

Earlier non-military executions  
From 1790 to 1963, there were 332 Federal, 271 Territorial and 40 Indian Tribunal executions according to the most complete records. The youngest person executed was James Arcene on June 18, 1885, at the age of 23 for his role in a robbery and murder committed when he was 10 years old.

Military executions 

The United States military has executed 135 people since 1916. The most recent person to be executed by the military is U.S. Army Private John A. Bennett, executed on April 13, 1961, for rape and attempted murder. Since the end of the Civil War in 1865, only one person has been executed for a purely military offense: Private Eddie Slovik, who was executed on January 31, 1945, after being convicted of desertion.

See also 
 List of death row inmates held by the United States federal government
 Capital punishment by the United States federal government
 Capital punishment in the United States
  List of people executed for crimes committed within the District of Columbia

References